Clemens Heights is a neighborhood in southwestern Lexington, Kentucky, United States. Its streets are all named after things associated with Mark Twain, whose real name was Samuel Clemens. Its boundaries are Old Higbee Mill Road to the north, Clemens Drive and Carevares Drive to the east, Copper Run Boulevard to the south, and Dogwood Park to the west.

Neighborhood statistics

 Area: 
 Population: 213
 Population density: 2,047 people per square mile
 Median household income (2010): $82,714

References

Neighborhoods in Lexington, Kentucky